Abalienatio, in Roman law, is a legal transfer of property by sale or other alienation. According to Cicero, .

References
 Dictionary of Greek and Roman Antiquities, John Murray, London, 1875

Roman law